Falconer Larkworthy (4 April 1833–14 May 1928) was a New Zealand banker and financier. He was born in Weymouth, Dorset, England on 4 April 1833.

References

1833 births
1928 deaths
New Zealand bankers
New Zealand businesspeople
People from Weymouth, Dorset
English emigrants to New Zealand